Parququcha (Quechua parquy irrigation, qucha lake, "irrigation lake", hispanicized spelling Parccoccocha) is a lake in Peru located in the Ayacucho Region, Parinacochas Province, Coracora District.

See also
List of lakes in Peru

References

Lakes of Peru
Lakes of Ayacucho Region